Nermin Ibrahimović (born 4 May 1990) is a Serbian footballer who plays as a striker for VfR Mannheim.

External links

1990 births
Living people
Sportspeople from Novi Pazar
Bosniaks of Serbia
Serbian footballers
Stuttgarter Kickers II players
Stuttgarter Kickers players
3. Liga players
Association football forwards